Emanuel Farber (February 20, 1917 – August 18, 2008) was an American painter, film critic and writer. Often described as "iconoclastic", Farber developed a distinctive  prose style  and set of theoretical stances which have had a large influence on later generations of film critics and influence on underground culture. Susan Sontag considered him to be "the liveliest, smartest, most original film critic this country has ever produced."

Farber's writing was distinguished by its "visceral," punchy style and inventive approach towards language; amongst other things, he is credited with coining the term "underground film" in 1957, and was an early advocate of such filmmakers as Howard Hawks, Rainer Werner Fassbinder, Werner Herzog, William Wellman, Raoul Walsh, Anthony Mann, Michael Snow, Chantal Akerman, George Kuchar, Nicolas Roeg, Samuel Fuller and Andy Warhol.

Farber's painting, which was often influenced by his favorite filmmakers, is held in equally high regard; he was dubbed the greatest still life painter of his generation by The New York Times.

Later in life, Farber focused more on art and teaching. He often worked in close collaboration with his wife, Patricia Patterson, also an artist.

Life and career

Emanuel Farber was born in Douglas, Arizona, the youngest of three brothers. His two older siblings, David and Leslie H. Farber, both became psychiatrists.

Farber attended UC Berkeley, Stanford University and the Rudolph Schaeffer School of Design. In the 1930s, Farber worked as a painter and carpenter, first in San Francisco and then in Washington DC. During this time, he attempted to join the Communist Party, though later in his life Farber was often critical of post-New Deal liberal politics.

His journalistic career began as an art critic, and in 1942 he moved to New York City and took a post as a film critic for The New Republic. This was followed by stints at Time (1949), The Nation (1949–1954), New Leader (1958–59), Cavalier (1966) and Artforum (1967–71). He has also contributed to Commentary, Film Culture, Film Comment, and City Magazine. He contributed art criticism to The New Republic and The Nation during the 1940s through 1950s.

Farber left New York City to teach at the University of California, San Diego in 1970. Reportedly, Farber traded his Manhattan loft to artist Don Lewallen in exchange for Lewallen's teaching position at UCSD after the two met at a party. Once in San Diego, he focused on painting and teaching, and retired from criticism altogether in 1977.

Originally an art professor only, Farber was approached about teaching a film class because of his background as a critic. He taught several courses, including "History of Film" and "Films in Social Context," which became famous for his unusual teaching style: he usually showed films only in disconnected pieces, sometimes running them backwards or adding in slides and sketches on the blackboard to illustrate his ideas. His exams had a reputation for being demanding and complicated, and occasionally required students to draw storyboards of scenes from memory.

Farber retired from teaching in 1987, at age 70. Towards the end of his life, he found it difficult to paint, and instead focused on collages and drawings; his final exhibition of new work occurred just a month before his death.

He died at his home in Leucadia, near Encinitas, California, on August 18, 2008.

Style
Farber's writing is well known for its distinctive prose style, which he personally described as "a struggle to remain faithful to the transitory, multisuggestive complication of a movie image." He cited the sportswriters of his era as an influence, and frequently used sports metaphors, especially ones related to baseball, in his writings on art and cinema.

Farber frequently championed genre filmmakers like Howard Hawks, Anthony Mann and Raoul Walsh; however, despite his fondness for B-films, Farber was often critical of film noir.

"White Elephant Art vs. Termite Art"

One of Farber's best-known essays is "White Elephant Art vs. Termite Art", which originally appeared in 1962 in Film Culture. In it, he writes on the virtues of "termite art" and the excesses of "white elephant art" and champions the B film and under-appreciated auteurs, which he felt were able, termite-like, to burrow into a topic. Bloated, pretentious, white elephant art lacks the economy of expression found in the greatest works of termite art, according to Farber. Farber saw termite art as spontaneous and subversive, going in bold new directions, and white elephant art as formal and tradition-bound. He offers John Wayne's performance in The Man Who Shot Liberty Valance as a quintessential example of cinematic termite art, but scorns the films of Truffaut and Antonioni.

"Termite-tapeworm-fungus-moss art," Farber contends, "goes always forward eating its own boundaries, and, like as not, leaves nothing in its path other than the signs of eager, industrious, unkempt activity."

Reputation and influence
Farber is frequently named as one of the greatest film critics, and his work has had a lasting impact on the generations of critics that followed him.

An appearance by Manny Farber at the San Francisco Film Festival is shown in the documentary, For the Love of Movies: The Story of American Film Criticism, in which he is called "criticism's supreme stylist" and his unusual use of language is discussed by The Nation critic Stuart Klawans.

Further reading 
 Originally released by Praeger Publishers in 1971.
"Manny Farber and Patricia Patterson Interviewed by Richard Thompson, 1977", Screening the Past.

Tributes

 — Cover story for the Spring issue. Sklar praises Farber's writing and his view that "movies weren't movies anymore" but regrets that "over time his viewpoint proved unworkable as an effective career strategy."

References

External links 

'The Elephant vs. The Termite'. 2006 UCSD MFA show at the University Art Gallery, title taken from Manny Farber's writings and inspired by his ideas on art.
Jonathan Rosenbaum on Manny Farber
rouge 12, 2008 
A dozen of Manny Farber's classic pieces from 1940s to 1960s

1917 births
2008 deaths
20th-century American male writers
20th-century American non-fiction writers
20th-century American painters
21st-century American painters
20th-century American Jews
American art critics
American film critics
American male painters
Comics critics
People from Douglas, Arizona
Rudolph Schaeffer School of Design alumni
Stanford University alumni
University of California, Berkeley alumni
University of California, San Diego faculty
21st-century American Jews
20th-century American male artists